Tatsuya Ito (born 26 June 1997) is a Japanese professional footballer who plays as a forward for German club 1. FC Magdeburg on loan from Belgian side Sint-Truiden.

Club career
Ito was nominated for Bundesliga's rookie of the year award 2018.

On 22 August 2019, he joined Belgian club Sint-Truiden.

On 21 January 2022, Ito was loaned to 1. FC Magdeburg in 3. Liga.

International career
On 30 August 2018, Ito received his first international call-up to the Japan national team for the Kirin Challenge Cup 2018.

On 24 May 2019, Ito was called up by Japan's head coach Hajime Moriyasu to feature in the Copa América, held in Brazil.

References

External links
 
 

1997 births
Living people
People from Taitō
Japanese footballers
Association football forwards
Hamburger SV II players
Hamburger SV players
Sint-Truidense V.V. players
1. FC Magdeburg players
Bundesliga players
2. Bundesliga players
3. Liga players
Regionalliga players
Belgian Pro League players
Japanese expatriate footballers
Japanese expatriate sportspeople in Germany
Expatriate footballers in Germany
Japanese expatriate sportspeople in Belgium
Expatriate footballers in Belgium